Laide is a small village in the northwest of the Highlands of Scotland. It is situated on the southern shore of Gruinard Bay, about 30 km west of Ullapool.

Laide Wood
Situated just outside Laide on the A832 heading West is 'Laide Community Wood'. Owned and managed by a charity called Laide Wood for the benefit the local community, Laide wood is recreational facility open all year round.

Geography
The village offers views of Gruinard Island and the Summer Isles. The area has many beaches such as at Mellon Udrigle and Gruinard which are within 5 minutes' driving distance of the village. Gairloch, with its many facilities is within 20 minutes driving distance.

The A832 road runs through Laide.

References

Populated places in Ross and Cromarty